Muqabla may refer to:
 Muqabla (1993 film), a 1993 Hindi film directed by T. Rama Rao
 Muqabla (1979 film), a 1979 Hindi action film directed by Rajkumar Kohli

See also
 Muqabala, a 1942 Bollywood action drama film directed by Batuk Bhatt and Babubhai Mistri